Godzilla 2 may refer to:
 Godzilla Raids Again, the second movie featuring Godzilla in the franchise's Showa era
 Godzilla: City on the Edge of Battle, the second movie in the Godzilla anime trilogy produced by Polygon Pictures and Toho Animation
 Godzilla: King of the Monsters (2019 film), the second Godzilla movie in the MonsterVerse